Daniel Edward Patterson (born January 21, 1947, in Pasadena, California) is a former American volleyball player who competed in the 1968 Summer Olympics.

References

1947 births
Living people
American men's volleyball players
Olympic volleyball players of the United States
Volleyball players at the 1968 Summer Olympics
Volleyball players at the 1967 Pan American Games
Volleyball players at the 1971 Pan American Games
Pan American Games gold medalists for the United States
Pan American Games silver medalists for the United States
Sportspeople from Pasadena, California
Pan American Games medalists in volleyball
Medalists at the 1967 Pan American Games
Medalists at the 1971 Pan American Games
San Diego State Aztecs men's volleyball players